is a passenger railway station located in Mihama-ku, Chiba city, Chiba Prefecture, Japan, operated by the East Japan Railway Company (JR East).

Lines
Kaihimmakuhari Station is served by the Keiyō Line and is the turnaround point for many local trains to and from Tokyo Station. It is also served by Musashino Line trains to and from  during rush hours. It is 43.4 kilometers from the western terminus of the Keiyō Line at Tokyo Station. 

Some Uchibō Line limited express Sazanami and some Sotobō Line limited express Wakashio services stop at this station. JR periodically offers additional limited express trains to Tokyo Station during major events at Makuhari Messe, such as the Tokyo Motor Show and CEATEC.

Station layout
Kaihimmakuhari Station consists of two elevated island platforms serving four tracks. The station is staffed.

Platforms

Platforms 2 and 3 are used by stopping trains to allow non-stop trains to pass.

History
Kaihimmakuhari Station opened on 3 March 1986. The station was absorbed into the JR East network upon the privatization of JNR on 1 April 1987. 

Station numbering was introduced in 2016 with Kaihimmakuhari being assigned station number JE13.

Passenger statistics
In fiscal 2019, the station was used by an average of 68,111 passengers daily

Surrounding area
Kaihimmakuhari Station is close to Makuhari new town which also received the Good Design Award. The following can also be found close to the station.

 Makuhari Messe convention centre
 Kanda University of International Studies
 Teikyo Heisei University Makuhari Campus
 Chiba College of Health Science Makuhari Campus
 The Open University of Japan
 Makuhari Junior and Senior High School
 Showa Gakuin Shuei Junior and Senior High School
 ZOZO Marine Stadium
 Wangan-Chiba IC of the Higashi-Kantō Expressway
 Hamada River

Bus terminal

Highway buses 
 Airport Limousine; For Narita International Airport (Keisei Bus, Chiba City Bus, Narita Airport Transport)
 Airport Limousine; For Haneda Airport (Airport Transport Service, Keihin Kyuko Bus, Keisei Bus, Chiba City Bus)
 For Suigo-Itako, Kashima Shrine, Kashimajingū Station (Kantō Railway)
 Strawberry Liner; For Gumyō Station, Narutō Station (Chiba Flower Bus)
 For Shisui Premium Outret (Chiba Flower Bus, Chiba Green Bus)
 For Fuji-Q Highland, Kawaguchiko Station (Keisei Bus, Fujikyu Yamanashi Bus)
 Yamato; For Tenri Station, Nara Station, Kintetsu-Kōriyama Station, Chūgū-ji, Hōryū-ji, and Goidō Station (Keisei Bus Nara Kotsu)
 For Ōtsu Station, Yamashina Station, Sanjō Station, and Kyōto Station (Chiba Chuo Bus)
 For Senri-Chūō Station, Shin-Ōsaka Station, Umeda Station, and Sannomiya Station (Keisei Bus)
 South Wave; For Sakaihigashi Station, Sakai Station, Izumigaoka Station, Wakayama Station, and Wakayamashi Station (Narita Airport Transport, Wakayama Bus)

Local bus services

See also
 List of railway stations in Japan

References

External links

 JR East station information 
 Kaihimmakuhari Station bus terminal map
 Keisei Bus Makuhari New City route map 

Railway stations in Japan opened in 1986
Keiyō Line
Railway stations in Chiba (city)